Markus Hurme (born 1 February 1978) is a Finnish snowboarder. He competed in the men's halfpipe event at the 1998 Winter Olympics.

References

1978 births
Living people
Finnish male snowboarders
Olympic snowboarders of Finland
Snowboarders at the 1998 Winter Olympics
Sportspeople from Vantaa